Islamic Secondary School Koidu (ISSK) is a government-sponsored secondary school located in Koidutown, Kono District, Sierra Leone.  The school was founded by a Mandingo philanthropist Alhaji Sheku "Taylor" Koita in 1979.  Although the school has an Islamic tradition, student from all religious background are accepted, and the teachers came from different religious background.  The school is regarded as one of the best secondary schools in Kono District.

Islamic schools in Sierra Leone
1979 establishments in Sierra Leone
Educational institutions established in 1979
Islamic secondary schools in Africa
Koidu